Benjamim Guimarães is a steam paddle boat based in Pirapora, Minas Gerais, Brazil.

It was built at Pittsburgh in the United States by James Rees and Company in 1913, one of a number of similar steamboats built for South American service. It originally navigated the rivers of the Amazon basin. In the 1920s Benjamim Guimarães moved to the port of Pirapora on the Sao Francisco River.

Benjamim Guimarães is the only functioning steam paddle boat in all of Brazil.  It is a tourist attraction and makes routine public trips on the São Francisco River from Pirapora downstream to the beginning of the Das Velhas River.

References

Ships of Brazil
1913 ships
Paddle steamers
Ships built in Pittsburgh